Sir Andrew Alexander Steel Stark  (30 December 1916 – 3 April 2006) was a British diplomat.

Early life and military service
He was educated at Bathgate Academy and the University of Edinburgh. This included a semester at the University of Heidelberg studying German. He then worked as an English teacher in Edinburgh between 1937 and 1939. After training with the 166th Officer Cadet Training Unit, Stark commissioned into the Green Howards on 9 November 1940. He served throughout the Second World War, latterly on the staff of Dwight D. Eisenhower as a German-speaking intelligence officer having transferred to the Intelligence Corps.

In 1944 he married Rosemary Parker and together they had three sons. In 1948 he was demobilised and joined HM Diplomatic Service.

Diplomatic career
Stark worked as Assistant Private Secretary to Anthony Eden, the Foreign Secretary, from 1953 to 1955. He then held diplomatic posts in Vienna, Belgrade, Rome and Bonn. He was invested as a Companion of the Order of St Michael and St George in 1964 and as a Commander of the Royal Victorian Order in 1965. In 1968, Stark was appointed, with ambassadorial rank, to the British Delegation to the United Nations and in the Seven Nation Committee working for the reform and reorganisation of the UN. He then served on the staff of the UN for three years from 1968 to 1971, as Deputy Secretary-General (Administration). That year he became British Ambassador to Denmark, serving in the role until 1976. In 1975 he was elevated as a Knight Commander of the Order of St Michael and St George. Between 1976 and his retirement two years later Stark was Deputy Under-Secretary of State at the Foreign and Commonwealth Office.

Later life
After leaving the FCO, Stark was invited by Mærsk Mc-Kinney Møller to be chairman of Maersk's UK subsidiary, a position he held until 1987. From 1983 to 1995 he was chairman of the Anglo-Danish Society and then served as the Society's honorary president until his death. Stark was Pro-Chancellor of the University of Essex from 1983 to 1995.

References

1916 births
2006 deaths
Alumni of the University of Edinburgh
Ambassadors of the United Kingdom to Denmark
British Army personnel of World War II
Companions of the Order of St Michael and St George
Commanders of the Royal Victorian Order
Green Howards officers
Intelligence Corps officers
Knights Commander of the Order of St Michael and St George
Maersk people
Members of HM Diplomatic Service
People educated at Bathgate Academy
20th-century British diplomats
People from Fauldhouse